Douglas Robert Elliott (born September 3, 1962) is a Canadian musician best known for his work in the alternative rock group Odds. As a child growing up in the Rocky Mountain town of Jasper, Alberta, he took piano lessons and later played trombone and then bass in the Jasper Jr-Sr High School band. At the age of 14 he was playing professionally in local bands. Upon graduating high school in 1980, Elliott went to Malaspina University-College for two years and then to New York city to live with, and be mentored by his cousin, renowned jazz bassist Rick Kilburn (who was at that time playing with Chet Baker, Dave Brubeck and Mose Allison.). He then moved to Vancouver, B.C.

While in his first year at Malaspina College Elliott met drummer Pat Steward. The two struck up a working relationship that saw them perform as the rhythm section for several west coast bands before achieving some notoriety with the colourful Vancouver ska unit "Rubber Biscuit".  In 1984, Bryan Adams recruited Steward for drum duties and their band "Rubber Biscuit" soon fizzled.

Elliott worked in several local bands and did sessions. In 1987 he briefly toured as bassist with "k.d. lang & the reclines" in support of her album Angel with a Lariat. Upon returning home to Vancouver he began writing and rehearsing with singer/guitarist Steven Drake and drummer Paul Brennan in hopes of forming a new band. Brennan brought in singer/guitarist Craig Northey and they made their live debut as "the Odds" in November 1987.

Odds eventually travelled to Los Angeles to make their mark and were signed by Zoo Entertainment/BMG. They released their debut album Neopolitan in 1991. Odds released three more albums eventually achieving platinum success in their native Canada and critical success worldwide.

Odds broke up in 1999 and Elliott continued to work with Northey and Steward on various film and recording projects. He performed live and recorded on Northey's solo debut Giddy Up and continued on with him for Northey Valenzuela (with Gin Blossoms Jesse Valenzuela) and Stripper's Union (with The Tragically Hip's Rob Baker). Elliott worked as live bassist for Long John Baldry and Jerry Doucette in this period and recorded with Canadian alt rockers Limblifter, as well as Spirit of the West's John Mann. From 2002 to 2011, Elliott worked as bassist in the Colin James Band, and rejoined Odds upon their reformation in 2008.

On February 21, 2013, Odds released an EP called "the Most Beautiful Place on Earth"

Discography

Albums
1991: Odds: Neopolitan
1993: Odds: Bedbugs
1995: Odds: Good Weird Feeling
1996: Odds: Nest
1996: k.d. lang/Various Artists: Best of Austin City Limits: Country Music's Finest Hour
1996: Kim Stockwood: Bonavista
1999: Sharkskin: Sharkskin
2000: Limblifter: Bellaclava
2002: John Mann: Acoustic Kitty
2002: Bruce McCulloch: Drunk Baby Project
2002: Various Artists: Women & Songs 6
2002: Camille Miller: She Knows 
2003: Northey Valenzuela: Northey Valenzuela
2005: Colin James: Limelight
2005: Stripper's Union: Stripper's Union Local 518
2009: Odds: Cheerleader
2010: Swan: Salt March
2011: Stripper's Union: The Deuce 
2011: Gerry Barnum: Step On It
2013: Odds: the Most Beautiful Place on Earth

Film and television

See also
Canadian Rock
Canadian blues

References

1962 births
Living people
Canadian bass guitarists
Canadian male singers
Canadian rock singers
Canadian alternative rock musicians
Musicians from Edmonton
Alternative rock bass guitarists
Alternative rock singers
Male bass guitarists